Djibouti competed at the 2015 African Games held in Brazzaville, Republic of the Congo.

Medal summary

Medal table

Athletics 

Abdi Waiss Mouhyadin won the silver medal in the men's 1500 metres event.

Swimming 

Several swimmers represented Djibouti at the 2015 African Games.

References 

Nations at the 2015 African Games
2015
African Games